Chioninia vaillantii, also known commonly as Vaillant's mabuya or Vaillant's skink, is a species of skink in the family Scincidae. The species is endemic to the Cape Verde Islands. There are two recognized subspecies.

Conservation status
C. vaillantii is listed as endangered by the IUCN because the species occurs as a very fragmented population, and the quality of its habitat is declining.

Geographic range
Vaillant's mabuya occurs on the islands Fogo and Santiago, and the islet Ilhéu de Cima.

Habitat
The preferred natural habitat of C. vaillantii is shrubland.

Reproduction
C. vaillantii is viviparous.

Subspecies
Two subspecies are recognized as being valid including the nominotypical subspecies.
Chioninia vaillantii vaillantii 
Chioninia vaillantii xanthotis 

Nota bene: A trinomial authority in parentheses indicates that the subspecies was originally described in a genus other than Chioninia.

Etymology
The specific name, vaillantii, is in honor of French herpetologist Léon Louis Vaillant.

References

Further reading
Boulenger GA (1887). Catalogue of the Lizards in the British Museum (Natural History). Second Edition. Volume III ... Scincidæ ... London: Trustees of the British Museum (Natural History). (Taylor and Francis, printers). xii + 575 pp. + Plates I–XL. (Mabuia vaillantii, new species, pp. 159–160 + Plate VII).
Mausfeld P, Schmitz A, Böhme W, Misof B, Vrcibradic D, Rocha CFD (2002). "Phylogenetic Affinities of Mabuya atlantica Schmidt, 1945, Endemic to the Atlantic Ocean Archipelago of Fernando de Noronha (Brazil): Necessity of Partitioning the Genus Mabuya Fitzinger, 1826 (Scincidae: Lygosominae)". Zoologischer Anzeiger 241 (3): 281–293. (Chioninia vaillantii, new combination).
Miralles A, Vasconcelos R, Perera A, Harris DJ, Carranza S (2010). "An integrated taxonomic revision of the Cape Verdean skinks (Squamata, Scincidae)". Zoologica Scripta 40 (1): 16–44. (Chioninia vaillantii xanthotis, new subspecies).

vaillantii
Endemic vertebrates of Cape Verde
Reptiles described in 1887
Taxa named by George Albert Boulenger
Fauna of Fogo, Cape Verde
Fauna of Santiago, Cape Verde